State Road 558 (SR 558) is a State Road in the southwestern section of the U.S. state of Indiana. SR 558 was originally introduced in the 1950s to connect the Crane Naval Depot, now Naval Surface Warfare Center Crane Division with SR 45, now US 231.

Route description 
SR 558 begins at an intersection with U.S. Route 231 and State Road 58 in rural Daviess County. The road heads east before curving southeast. The SR 558 designation ends at the Daviess–Martin county line, at the western town limits of the town of Crane. The continues east as a local road passing through the town of Crane and entering the Naval Surface Warfare Center Crane Division. The highest traffic count is at the western end of SR 558, where 3,989 vehicles travel the highway on average each day. The lowest traffic count is at the eastern end of SR 558, where 3,403 vehicles travel the highway on average each day.

History 
SR 558 was first designated between 1952 and 1953. The original routing started at SR 45 (now US 231) and SR 58 and ran east-southeast to the Daviess–Martin county line much as it does today.

Major intersections

References

External links

558
Transportation in Daviess County, Indiana